Wierzchowiny  is a village in the administrative district of Gmina Wadowice Górne, within Mielec County, Podkarpackie Voivodeship, in south-eastern Poland.

References

Wierzchowiny